The 2020 Philadelphia Phillies season was the 138th season in the history of the franchise, its 17th season at Citizens Bank Park, and the first season under new manager Joe Girardi. The Phillies failed to improve from their 81–81 record in the previous year and missed the playoffs for the ninth straight season.

On March 12, 2020, MLB announced that because of the ongoing COVID-19 pandemic, the start of the regular season would be delayed by at least two weeks in addition to the remainder of spring training being cancelled. Four days later, it was announced that the start of the season would be pushed back indefinitely due to the recommendation made by the CDC to restrict events of more than 50 people for eight weeks. On June 23, commissioner Rob Manfred unilaterally implemented a 60-game season. Players reported to training camp on July 1 in order to resume spring training and prepare for Opening Day on July 24.

Season standings

National League East

National League Wild Card

Record vs. opponents

Game log

|- style="background:#fbb"
| 1 || July 24 || Marlins || 2–5 || Sandy Alcántara (1–0) || Aaron Nola (0–1) || Brandon Kintzler (1) || 0–1
|- style="background:#bfb"
| 2 || July 25 || Marlins || 7–1 || Zack Wheeler (1–0) || Alex Vesia (0–1) || — || 1–1
|- style="background:#fbb"
| 3 || July 26 || Marlins || 6–11 || Stephen Tarpley (1–0) || Cole Irvin (0–1) || — || 1–2
|- style="background:#bbb"
| — || July 27 || Yankees || colspan=5 | Postponed (COVID-19); Makeup: August 5
|- style="background:#bbb"
| — || July 28 || Yankees || colspan=5 | Postponed (COVID-19); Makeup: August 6
|- style="background:#bbb"
| — || July 29 || @ Yankees || colspan=5 | Postponed (COVID-19); Makeup: August 3
|- style="background:#bbb"
| — || July 30 || @ Yankees || colspan=5 | Postponed (COVID-19); Makeup: August 4
|- style="background:#bbb"
| — || July 31 || @ Blue Jays || colspan=5 | Postponed (COVID-19); Makeup: August 1 as a traditional doubleheader
|-

|- style="background:#"
|- style="background:#bbb"
| — || August 1   || @ Blue Jays || colspan=5 | Postponed (COVID-19); Makeup: August 20 as a straight, 7-inning doubleheader
|- style="background:#bbb"
| — || August 1  || @ Blue Jays || colspan=5 | Postponed (COVID-19); Makeup: August 20 as a straight, 7-inning doubleheader
|- style="background:#bbb"
| — || August 2 || @ Blue Jays || colspan=5 | Postponed (COVID-19); Makeup: September 18 as a straight, 7-inning doubleheader
|- style="background:#fbb"
| 4 || August 3 || @ Yankees || 3–6 || Gerrit Cole (3–0) || Jake Arrieta (0–1) || Zack Britton (4) || 1–3
|- style="background:#bbb"
| — || August 4 || @ Marlins || colspan=5 | Postponed (COVID-19); Makeup: September 11 as a straight, 7-inning doubleheader
|- style="background:#bbb"
| — || August 4 || @ Yankees || colspan=5 | Postponed (inclement weather); Makeup: August 5 as a straight, 7-inning doubleheader
|- style="background:#bbb"
| — || August 5 || @ Marlins || colspan=5 | Postponed (COVID-19); Makeup: Makeup: September 13 as a straight, 7-inning doubleheader
|- style="background:#bfb"
| 5 || August 5  || @ Yankees || 11–7 || Zack Wheeler (2–0) || J. A. Happ (0–1) || Héctor Neris (1) || 2–3
|- style="background:#fbb"
| 6 || August 5  || Yankees || 1–3 || Adam Ottavino (2–0) || Tommy Hunter (0–1) || Zack Britton (5) || 2–4
|- style="background:#bbb"
| — || August 6 || @ Marlins || colspan=5 | Postponed (COVID-19); Makeup: September 14 as a single game
|- style="background:#bfb"
| 7 || August 6 || Yankees || 5–4 || Deolis Guerra (1–0) || Jordan Montgomery (1–1) || Héctor Neris (2) || 3–4
|- style="background:#bbb"
| — || August 7 || Braves || colspan=5 | Postponed (rain); Makeup: August 9 as a straight, 7-inning doubleheader
|- style="background:#bfb"
| 8 || August 8 || Braves || 5–0 || Jake Arrieta (1–1) || Kyle Wright (0–2) || — || 4–4
|- style="background:#fbb"
| 9 || August 9  || Braves || 2–5 || Tyler Matzek (2–0) || Deolis Guerra (1–1) || Mark Melancon (3) || 4–5
|- style="background:#fbb"
| 10 || August 9  || Braves || 0–8 || Max Fried (3–0) || Spencer Howard (0–1) || — || 4–6
|- style="background:#bfb"
| 11 || August 10 || Braves || 13–8 || Aaron Nola (1–1) || Sean Newcomb (0–2) || — || 5–6
|- style="background:#fbb"
| 12 || August 11 || Orioles || 9–10  || Cole Sulser (1–1) || Deolis Guerra (1–2) || Travis Lakins, Sr. (1) || 5–7
|- style="background:#fbb"
| 13 || August 12 || Orioles || 4–5 || Shawn Armstrong (2–0) || Zach Eflin (0–1) || Cole Sulser (4) || 5–8
|- style="background:#fbb"
| 14 || August 13 || Orioles || 4–11 || Tom Eshelman (1–0) || Jake Arrieta (1–2) || — || 5–9
|- style="background:#bfb"
| 15 || August 14 || Mets || 6–5 || Héctor Neris (1–0) || Seth Lugo (1–2) || — || 6–9
|- style="background:#bfb"
| 16 || August 15 || Mets || 6–2 || Aaron Nola (2–1) || Steven Matz (0–4) || — || 7–9
|- style="background:#bfb"
| 17 || August 16 || Mets || 6–2 || Zack Wheeler (3–0) || Rick Porcello (1–3) || — || 8–9
|- style="background:#bfb"
| 18 || August 18 || @ Red Sox || 13–6 || Blake Parker (1–0) || Josh Taylor (0–1) || — || 9–9
|- style="background:#fbb"
| 19 || August 19 || @ Red Sox || 3–6 || Austin Brice (1–0) || Jake Arrieta (1–3) || Brandon Workman (4) || 9–10
|- style="background:#fbb"
| 20 || August 20  || @ Blue Jays || 2–3 || Jordan Romano (2–1) || Deolis Guerra (1–3) || — || 9–11
|- style="background:#fbb"
| 21 || August 20  || @ Blue Jays || 8–9 || Anthony Kay (2–0) || Héctor Neris (1–1) || A. J. Cole (1) || 9–12
|- style="background:#fbb"
| 22 || August 21 || @ Braves || 2–11 || Max Fried (4–0) || Aaron Nola (2–2) || — || 9–13
|- style="background:#fbb"
| 23 || August 22 || @ Braves || 5–6 || Mark Melancon (2–0) || Brandon Workman (0–1) || — || 9–14
|- style="background:#bfb"
| 24 || August 23 || @ Braves || 5–4 || Zach Eflin (1–1) || Josh Tomlin (1–1) || Brandon Workman (5) || 10–14
|- style="background:#bfb"
| 25 || August 25 || @ Nationals || 8–3 || Jake Arrieta (2–3) || Erick Fedde (1–2) || — || 11–14
|- style="background:#bfb"
| 26 || August 26 || @ Nationals || 3–2 || Aaron Nola (3–2) || Will Harris (0–1) || Brandon Workman (6) || 12–14
|- style="background:#bbb"
| — || August 27 || @ Nationals || colspan=5 | Postponed (strikes due to shooting of Jacob Blake); Makeup: September 22 as a straight, 7-inning doubleheader
|- style="background:#bfb"
| 27 || August 28 || Braves || 7–4  || Blake Parker (2–0) || Mark Melancon (2–1) || — || 13–14
|- style="background:#bfb"
| 28 || August 29 || Braves || 4–1 || Zach Eflin (2–1) || Josh Tomlin (1–2) || Brandon Workman (7) || 14–14
|- style="background:#fbb"
| 29 || August 30 || Braves || 10–12 || A. J. Minter (1–0) || Jake Arrieta (2–4) || Mark Melancon (6) || 14–15
|- style="background:#bfb"
| 30 || August 31 || Nationals || 8–6 || Spencer Howard (1–1) || Erick Fedde (1–3) || — || 15–15
|-

|- style="background:#bfb"
| 31 || September 1 || Nationals || 6–0 || Aaron Nola (4–2) || Patrick Corbin (2–3) || — || 16–15
|- style="background:#bfb"
| 32 || September 2 || Nationals || 3–0 || Zack Wheeler (4–0) || Max Scherzer (3–2) || Brandon Workman (8) || 17–15
|- style="background:#bfb"
| 33 || September 3 || Nationals || 6–5  || Blake Parker (3–0) || Sean Doolittle (0–2) || — || 18–15
|- style="background:#bfb"
| 34 || September 4 || @ Mets || 5–3 || Jake Arrieta (3–4) || Jared Hughes (1–2) || Brandon Workman (9) || 19–15
|- style="background:#fbb"
| 35 || September 5 || @ Mets || 1–5 || Seth Lugo (2–2) || Spencer Howard (1–2) || — || 19–16
|- style="background:#fbb"
| 36 || September 6 || @ Mets || 1–14 || Jacob deGrom (3–1) || Aaron Nola (4–3) || — || 19–17
|- style="background:#bfb"
| 37 || September 7 || @ Mets || 9–8  || Brandon Workman (1–1) || Miguel Castro (1–1) || Héctor Neris (3) || 20–17
|- style="background:#bfb"
| 38 || September 8  || Red Sox || 6–5 || Héctor Neris (2–1) || Matt Barnes (1–3) || — || 21–17
|- style="background:#fbb"
| 39 || September 8  || Red Sox || 2–5 || Chris Mazza (1–1) || David Phelps (2–4) || Marcus Walden (1) || 21–18
|- style="background:#fbb"
| 40 || September 10 || @ Marlins || 5–6 || Yimi García (1–0) || Brandon Workman (1–2) || — || 21–19
|- style="background:#bfb"
| 41 || September 11  || @ Marlins || 11–0 || Aaron Nola (5–3) || Trevor Rogers (1–1) || — || 22–19
|- style="background:#fbb"
| 42 || September 11  || @ Marlins || 3–5 || James Hoyt (2–0) || Ranger Suárez (0–1) || Yimi García (1) || 22–20
|- style="background:#bfb"
| 43 || September 12 || @ Marlins || 12–6 || Heath Hembree (3–0) || José Ureña (0–1) || — || 23–20
|- style="background:#fbb"
| 44 || September 13  || @ Marlins || 1–2 || Sixto Sánchez (3–1) || Ramón Rosso (0–1) || — || 23–21
|- style="background:#fbb"
| 45 || September 13  || @ Marlins || 1–8 || Braxton Garrett (1–0) || Zach Eflin (2–2) || — || 23–22
|- style="background:#fbb"
| 46 || September 14 || @ Marlins || 2–6 || Pablo López (4–4) || Vince Velasquez (0–1) || — || 23–23
|- style="background:#bfb"
| 47 || September 15 || Mets || 4–1 || Jake Arrieta (4–4) || Rick Porcello (1–5) || Héctor Neris (4) || 24–23
|- style="background:#fbb"
| 48 || September 16 || Mets || 4–5 || Miguel Castro (2–1) || Héctor Neris (2–2) || Edwin Díaz (4) || 24–24
|- style="background:#fbb"
| 49 || September 17 || Mets || 6–10 || Justin Wilson (2–1) || Brandon Workman (1–3) || — || 24–25
|- style="background:#bfb"
| 50 || September 18  || @ Blue Jays || 7–0 || Zach Eflin (3–2) || Robbie Ray (2–5) || — || 25–25
|- style="background:#bfb"
| 51 || September 18  || Blue Jays || 8–7 || Connor Brogdon (1–0) || Rafael Dolis (2–2) || Héctor Neris (5) || 26–25
|- style="background:#bfb"
| 52 || September 19 || Blue Jays || 3–1 || Vince Velasquez (1–1) || Hyun-jin Ryu (4–2) || Tommy Hunter (1) || 27–25
|- style="background:#fbb"
| 53 || September 20 || Blue Jays || 3–6 || Taijuan Walker (4–3) || Adonis Medina (0–1) || Anthony Bass (6) || 27–26
|- style="background:#fbb"
| 54 || September 21 || @ Nationals || 1–5 || Aníbal Sánchez (3–5) || Zack Wheeler (4–1) || — || 27–27
|- style="background:#fbb"
| 55 || September 22  || @ Nationals || 1–5 || Austin Voth (1–5) || Aaron Nola (5–4) || — || 27–28
|- style="background:#fbb"
| 56 || September 22  || @ Nationals || 7–8  || Daniel Hudson (3–2) || Brandon Workman (1–4) || — || 27–29
|- style="background:#bfb"
| 57 || September 23 || @ Nationals || 12–3 || Zach Eflin (4–2) || Erick Fedde (2–4) || — || 28–29
|- style="background:#fbb"
| 58 || September 25 || @ Rays || 4–6 || Nick Anderson (2–1) || Adam Morgan (0–1) || John Curtiss (2) || 28–30
|- style="background:#fbb"
| 59 || September 26 || @ Rays || 3–4 || Peter Fairbanks (6–3) || Zack Wheeler (4–2) || Aaron Slegers (1) || 28–31
|- style="background:#fbb"
| 60 || September 27 || @ Rays || 0–5 || Josh Fleming (5–0) || Aaron Nola (5–5) || — || 28–32
|-

|- style="text-align:center;"
| Legend:       = Win       = Loss       = PostponementBold = Phillies team member

Roster
All players who made an appearance for the Phillies during 2020 are included.

Season summary

July
The Phillies dropped their home opener, 2–5, against Marlins but was highlighted by shortstop Didi Gregorius' home run. The team rebounded with a 7–1 victory the next day powered by Gregorius' second home run and designated hitter Phil Gosselin's 2-home run performance to give pitcher Zack Wheeler the victory in his Phillies' debut. The Marlins won the rubber match, 11–6, as the Phillies left the bases loaded 3 times in the latter half of the game.

COVID-19 outbreak
The Marlins' opening day catcher Jorge Alfaro was placed on the injured list after testing positive for COVID-19 earlier in the day. First baseman Garrett Cooper and outfielder Harold Ramírez also tested positive for COVID-19 shortly thereafter. Two days later prior to the final game of the opening series, Marlins' pitcher José Ureña tested positive for COVID-19 and was scratched from his start. Following the game the Marlins delayed their flight back to Miami due to concerns of an outbreak.

On July 27, the Marlins' home opener against the Baltimore Orioles was postponed amid reports that eight new players had tested positive for COVID-19. Reports stated that 11 Marlins players and two coaches had tested positive. MLB also postponed the Phillies' next game against the Yankees as the Yankees would be using the same clubhouse as the Marlins. The Marlins remained in Philadelphia pending further testing.

On July 28, sources reported that at least four more members of the Marlins had tested positive for COVID-19. In five days, the Marlins had a total of 17 people test positive for the virus. On the same day, the MLB announced that the Marlins and Phillies seasons would be put on hold and their opponents' schedules adjusted.

The Phillies' home-and-home series with the New York Yankees was postponed due to the COVID-19 outbreak. The July 31 game with the Toronto Blue Jays was also postponed and rescheduled as an August 1 traditional doubleheader. However, on July 30 after an unnamed coach and Phillies' clubhouse worker tested positive (which were later determined to be false positives), the Blue Jays series was postponed.

August
As Major League Baseball juggled the schedules, the Phillies opened August with a home-and-home series with the Yankees, making up games postponed from the previous week. Hours before the first pitch on August 3, the next day's game was postponed due to the impending inclement weather with the approach of Hurricane Isaias, setting up a doubleheader at Citizens Bank Park where each team would take turns at being the home team. Earning a split of the 4-game Yankees' series, the Phillies went on to split the 4-game Atlanta Braves' series. After being swept in a 3-games series by the Baltimore Orioles, the Phillies completed their homestand by sweeping the New York Mets.

In their first real roadtrip of the season (they had played a single game in New York earlier in the month but traveled back to Philadelphia after the game), the Phillies split a 2-game series with the Boston Red Sox. After leading early in both games of a doubleheader against in the Blue Jays, the Phillies were swept in the brief 1-day stay in Buffalo, New York, the Jays' home stadium (Sahlen Field) in 2020 due to the pandemic. In Atlanta, the Phillies led early in the opening 2 games of the series only to have the bullpen lose the games in the final innings. In the Atlanta finale, broadcast on ESPN's Sunday Night Baseball, the Phillies held on for a 5–4 victory with the game-tying run thrown out at home plate to end the game.

Playoffs again not reached
On September 27, 2020, the Phillies lost the season finale to the Tampa Bay Rays, 5–0, and they were therefore not eligible for the playoffs. If the Phillies had won that game and the San Francisco Giants and the Milwaukee Brewers had lost, they would have clinched the eighth playoff spot. The Giants and Brewers both lost their games.

Farm system

Due to safety concerns surrounding the COVID-19 pandemic, it was announced on June 30, 2020, that the 2020 Minor League Baseball season would not be played.

References

External links
 2020 Philadelphia Phillies season at Baseball Reference
 Philadelphia Phillies' official website

Philadelphia Phillies seasons
Philadelphia Phillies
Philadelphia Phillies